Nightstalkers is an American comic book series published by Marvel Comics from 1992 to 1994, featuring a trio of occult experts reluctantly banded together to fight supernatural threats. Operating under the business name Borderline Investigations, the team was composed of vampire hunters Blade and Frank Drake and private detective Hannibal King, all of whom had fought Count Dracula in the 1970s series The Tomb of Dracula. They are gathered by Doctor Strange in Nightstalkers #1 (November 1992) to battle an immediate threat, but under Strange's larger, hidden agenda.

The Nightstalkers appeared in Blade: Trinity.

Publication history
The team of vampire-hunters Blade and Frank Drake and vampiric private detective Hannibal King first reunited in Ghost Rider (vol. 3) #28 (cover dated August 1992). They subsequently starred in their own series, Nightstalkers, which ran 18 issues (November 1992–April 1994). It incorporated story threads from previous Marvel Comics supernatural series, primarily The Tomb of Dracula (April 1972–August 1979) where the three protagonists had first appeared.

The series' initial creative team was writer D. G. Chichester, penciller Ron Garney and inker Tom Palmer, reprising his role from The Tomb of Dracula. After 11 issues, Steven Grant took over scripting, with Frank Lovece wrapping up the fates of some of the 1970s series' characters in the last three issues. Artists included Mark Pacella, Kirk Van Wormer and Andrew Wildman.

Fictional team history
Before being formally gathered by Doctor Strange to fight supernatural threats, Hannibal King, Frank Drake, and Blade had founded the detective agency King, Drake, and Blade (later renamed Borderline Investigations).

After Strange manipulates the trio into forming the Nightstalkers, the team fights many emerging supernatural enemies. These include Lilith, Mother of All Demons; HYDRA's Department of Occult Armaments (DOA), led by Lt. Belial, and its renegade Dracula clone Bloodstorm; and the one-time Lord of Vampires, Varnae.

The Tomb of Dracula threads

In the final arc (#16–18, Feb.-April 1994), King's house, including Borderline's office, is destroyed by a HYDRA Dreadnought stealing Drake's anti-occult nanotech gun, the Exorcist. Doctor Strange reveals that the Montesi Formula, which had eradicated and prevented further vampires, was weakening. In response, he explains, he had gathered the three most experienced vampire-hunters so they could learn to function as a team before Dracula, the Lord of Vampires, returned. Since all three were traumatized by their early vampiric battles, Strange held off informing them of vampires' possible return until necessary.

In a final battle, Varnae, a previous Lord of Vampires who had already returned, takes psychic control of King and directs him to kill his comrades. King stakes himself instead. Drake attempts to sacrifice his own life to kill Varnae, engineering an Exorcist-powered explosion. Blade, in self-defense, has already staked Taj Nital, his old comrade from The Tomb of Dracula (who had been turned vampiric between the two series). Blade survives and attends his teammates' funeral but encounters King again in the subsequent series Blade. There he learns King's plunge into a metal pole (rather than silver or wood) had fortuitously not killed him and that he had escaped the explosion. King also informs Blade that Drake was left scarred and crippled in both body and mind.

In other media 
A revised version of the Nightstalkers was depicted in the 2004 film Blade: Trinity starring Wesley Snipes as Blade, Jessica Biel as Abigail Whistler and Ryan Reynolds as Hannibal King. In the film, Blade was not a Nightstalker himself but allied with them, albeit reluctantly, as they were younger and, in his eyes, less experienced. In contrast to the more mature and reserved Hannibal King depicted in the comics, Reynolds' revision of the character was in keeping with his history of humorous, extroverted characters. Abigail Whistler was the leader of the group. Unlike in the comic, there were several lesser members who, being unsuited for physical action, stayed at headquarters in supporting roles.

References

External links
 The Unofficial Handbook of Marvel Comics Creators

Marvel Comics superhero teams
Marvel Comics titles
Blade (comics)
Midnight Sons